Glycerol-3-phosphate dehydrogenase (GPDH) is an enzyme that catalyzes the reversible redox conversion of dihydroxyacetone phosphate (a.k.a. glycerone phosphate, outdated) to sn-glycerol 3-phosphate.

Glycerol-3-phosphate dehydrogenase serves as a major link between carbohydrate metabolism and lipid metabolism. It is also a major contributor of electrons to the electron transport chain in the mitochondria.

Older terms for glycerol-3-phosphate dehydrogenase include alpha glycerol-3-phosphate dehydrogenase (alphaGPDH) and glycerolphosphate dehydrogenase (GPDH). However, glycerol-3-phosphate dehydrogenase is not the same as glyceraldehyde 3-phosphate dehydrogenase (GAPDH), whose substrate is an aldehyde not an alcohol.

Metabolic function

GPDH plays a major role in lipid biosynthesis. Through the reduction of dihydroxyacetone phosphate into glycerol 3-phosphate, GPDH allows the prompt dephosphorylation of glycerol 3-phosphate into glycerol. Additionally, GPDH is one of the enzymes involved in maintaining the redox potential across the inner mitochondrial membrane.

Reaction 
The NAD+/NADH coenzyme couple act as an electron reservoir for metabolic redox reactions, carrying electrons from one reaction to another. Most of these metabolism reactions occur in the mitochondria. To regenerate NAD+ for further use, NADH pools in the cytosol must be reoxidized. Since the mitochondrial inner membrane is impermeable to both NADH and NAD+, these cannot be freely exchanged between the cytosol and mitochondrial matrix.

One way to shuttle this reducing equivalent across the membrane is through the Glycerol-3-phosphate shuttle, which employs the two forms of GPDH:

Cytosolic GPDH, or GPD1, is localized to the outer membrane of the mitochondria facing the cytosol, and catalyzes the reduction of dihydroxyacetone phosphate into glycerol-3-phosphate.
In conjunction, Mitochondrial GPDH, or GPD2, is embedded on the outer surface of the inner mitochondrial membrane, overlooking the cytosol, and catalyzes the oxidation of glycerol-3-phosphate to dihydroxyacetone phosphate.

The reactions catalyzed by cytosolic (soluble) and mitochondrial GPDH are as follows:

Variants 

There are two forms of GPDH:

The following human genes encode proteins with GPDH enzymatic activity:

GPD1

Cytosolic Glycerol-3-phosphate dehydrogenase (GPD1), is an NAD+-dependent enzyme that reduces dihydroxyacetone phosphate to glycerol-3-phosphate. Simultaneously, NADH is oxidized to NAD+ in the following reaction:

As a result, NAD+ is regenerated for further metabolic activity.

GPD1 consists of two subunits, and reacts with dihydroxyacetone phosphate and NAD+ though the following interaction:

Figure 4. The putative active site. The phosphate group of DHAP is half-encircled by the side-chain of Arg269, and interacts with Arg269 and Gly268 directly by hydrogen bonds (not shown). The conserved residues Lys204, Asn205, Asp260 and Thr264 form a stable hydrogen bonding network. The other hydrogen bonding network includes residues Lys120 and Asp260, as well as an ordered water molecule (with a B-factor of 16.4 Å2), which hydrogen bonds to Gly149 and Asn151 (not shown). In these two electrostatic networks, only the ε-NH3+ group of Lys204 is the nearest to the C2 atom of DHAP (3.4 Å).

GPD2
Mitochondrial glycerol-3-phosphate dehydrogenase (GPD2), catalyzes the irreversible oxidation of glycerol-3-phosphate to dihydroxyacetone phosphate and concomitantly transfers two electrons from FAD to the electron transport chain. GPD2 consists of 4 identical subunits.

Response to environmental stresses

Studies indicate that GPDH is mostly unaffected by pH changes: neither GPD1 or GPD2 is favored under certain pH conditions.
At high salt concentrations (E.g. NaCl), GPD1 activity is enhanced over GPD2, since an increase in the salinity of the medium leads to an accumulation of glycerol in response.
Changes in temperature do not appear to favor neither GPD1 nor GPD2.

Glycerol-3-phosphate shuttle 

The cytosolic together with the mitochondrial glycerol-3-phosphate dehydrogenase work in concert. Oxidation of cytoplasmic NADH by the cytosolic form of the enzyme creates glycerol-3-phosphate from dihydroxyacetone phosphate. Once the glycerol-3-phosphate has moved through the outer mitochondrial membrane it can then be oxidised by a separate isoform of glycerol-3-phosphate dehydrogenase that uses quinone as an oxidant and FAD as a co-factor. As a result, there is a net loss in energy, comparable to one molecule of ATP.

The combined action of these enzymes maintains the NAD+/NADH ratio that allows for continuous operation of metabolism.

Role in disease

The fundamental role of GPDH in maintaining the NAD+/NADH potential, as well as its role in lipid metabolism, makes GPDH a factor in lipid imbalance diseases, such as obesity.

Enhanced GPDH activity, particularly GPD2, leads to an increase in glycerol production. Since glycerol is a main subunit in lipid metabolism, its abundance can easily lead to an increase  in triglyceride accumulation at a cellular level. As a result, there is a tendency to form adipose tissue leading to an accumulation of fat that favors obesity.
GPDH has also been found to play a role in Brugada syndrome. Mutations in the gene encoding GPD1 have been proven to cause defects in the electron transport chain. This conflict with NAD+/NADH levels in the cell is believed to contribute to defects in cardiac sodium ion channel regulation and can lead to a lethal arrythmia during infancy.

Pharmacological target 
The mitochondrial isoform of G3P dehydrogenase is thought to be inhibited by metformin, a first line drug for type 2 diabetes.

Biological Research
Sarcophaga barbata was used to study the oxidation of L-3-glycerophosphate in mitochondria. It is found that the L-3-glycerophosphate does not enter the mitochondrial matrix, unlike pyruvate. This helps locate the L-3-glycerophosphate-flavoprotein oxidoreductase, which is on the inner membrane of the mitochondria.

Structure

Glycerol-3-phosphate dehydrogenase consists of two protein domains. The N-terminal domain is an NAD-binding domain, and the C-terminus acts as a substrate-binding domain. However, dimer and tetramer interface residues are involved in GAPDH-RNA binding, as GAPDH can exhibit several moonlighting activities, including the modulation of RNA binding and/or stability.

See also 
 substrate pages: glycerol 3-phosphate, dihydroxyacetone phosphate
 related topics: glycerol phosphate shuttle, creatine kinase, glycolysis, gluconeogenesis

References

Further reading

External links 
 equivalent entries:
 
 GPDH
 Yeast genome database GO term: GPDH 

Protein domains
EC 1.1.1